William Carlile Arnold (July 15, 1851 – March 20, 1906) was a Republican member of the U.S. House of Representatives from Pennsylvania.

William C. Arnold was born in Luthersburg, Pennsylvania.  He attended the public schools and Phillips Academy in Andover, Massachusetts.  He studied law, was admitted to the bar in Clearfield County, Pennsylvania, and practiced in Curwensville and Du Bois, Clearfield County, Pennsylvania.

Arnold was elected as a Republican to the Fifty-fourth and Fifty-fifth Congresses.  He was an unsuccessful candidate for reelection in 1898.  He resumed the practice of law in Clearfield County and died in Muskegon, Michigan, while on a business trip.  Interment in Oak Hill Cemetery in Curwensville.

Sources

The Political Graveyard

1851 births
1906 deaths
19th-century American politicians
People from Clearfield County, Pennsylvania
Phillips Academy alumni
Republican Party members of the United States House of Representatives from Pennsylvania